Pedro Medina (born 25 June 1941) is a Spanish former sports shooter. He competed in the 50 metre rifle, prone event at the 1964 Summer Olympics.

References

1941 births
Living people
Spanish male sport shooters
Olympic shooters of Spain
Shooters at the 1964 Summer Olympics
Sportspeople from the Province of Jaén (Spain)
20th-century Spanish people